Night Life is a 1927 American silent drama film directed by George Archainbaud and starring Alice Day, John Harron and Eddie Gribbon.

Synopsis
In post-World War I Vienna, a confidence trickster falls in love with a struggling waitress

Cast
 Alice Day as Anna
 John Harron as Max
 Eddie Gribbon as Nick
 Walter Hiers as Manager
 Lionel Braham as War Profiteer
 Kitty Barlow as 	Wife of War Profiteer
 Anne Shirley as Daughter of War Profiteer 
 Mary Jane Irving a Daughter of War Profiteer
 Audrey Sewell as Daughter of War Profiteer
 Earl Metcalfe as Swain
 Patricia Avery as 	Maid
 Snitz Edwards as Merry-Go-Round Manager
 Violet Palmer as 	Beer Garden Waitress
 Lydia Yeamans as Landlady

References

Bibliography
 Connelly, Robert B. The Silents: Silent Feature Films, 1910-36, Volume 40, Issue 2. December Press, 1998.
 Munden, Kenneth White. The American Film Institute Catalog of Motion Pictures Produced in the United States, Part 1. University of California Press, 1997.

External links
 

1927 films
1927 drama films
1920s English-language films
American silent feature films
Silent American drama films
American black-and-white films
Tiffany Pictures films
Films directed by George Archainbaud
Films set in Vienna
1920s American films